USC&GS Marmer was a United States Coast and Geodetic Survey survey ship in commission from 1957 to 1968.

Prior to her Coast and Geodetic Survey career, she served as the United States Public Health Service boarding tug USPHS Walter Wyman from 1932 to 1957.

Construction and Public Health Service career
Spedden Shipbuilding constructed the ship for the U.S. Public Health Service at Baltimore, Maryland, in 1932 as the boarding tug USPHS Walter Wyman. From 1932 to 1957, Walter Wyman carried Public Health Service personnel tasked with conducting shipboard health inspections to and from ships arriving in the United States. The Public Health Service retired Walter Wyman from service in 1957 and transferred her to the U.S. Coast and Geodetic Survey on 24 May 1957.

Coast and Geodetic Survey career

On 27 May 1957, the Coast and Geodetic Survey renamed the vessel USC&GS Marmer. She underwent conversion to a survey ship, followed by sea trials at Curtis Bay in Baltimore in the autumn of 1957. After her successful completion of sea trials, the Coast and Geodetic Survey commissioned her later in 1957. Used for the study of currents, Marmer operated along the United States East Coast until 1968, when she was decommissioned and replaced by the auxiliary survey vessel USC&GS Ferrel (ASV 92).

References 

Ships built in Baltimore
1932 ships
United States Public Health Service
Ships of the United States Coast and Geodetic Survey
Survey ships of the United States
Tugboats of the United States